Jo Van Daele (born 6 April 1972) is a male discus thrower from Belgium. His personal best throw is 64.24 metres, achieved in May 2001 in Halle.

He finished tenth at the 2002 European Championships. He also competed at the 2000 Summer Olympics and the World Championships in 1997, 2001, 2003 and 2005 without qualifying for the final round.

Achievements

References

1972 births
Living people
Belgian male discus throwers
Athletes (track and field) at the 2000 Summer Olympics
Olympic athletes of Belgium